Noor-ul-Haq (The light of Truth) is a two-part Arabic book written by Mirza Ghulam Ahmad, the founder of the Ahmadiyya Movement in 1894. It consists of both prose and poetry. The first part was written in refutation of a book written by Padre Imad Ud-Din Lahiz, a Christian preacher who had apostatised from Islam. The second part was written with regards to the solar and lunar eclipses which took place in 1894. With the publication of the book Ghulam  Ahmad issued an advertisement with a reward of rs5,000 to anyone who could produce its like in terms of literary style.

Background

In his book Tawzinul-Aqwal, known for its highly critical and inflammatory nature, Imadud-Din Lahiz criticised the style and language of the Quran, raised numerous objections against the personality of the Islamic prophet Muhammad and had criticised the concept of Jihad in Islam. He also wrote addressing the British government in India at the time alleging that Ghulam Ahmad who had claimed to be the Mahdi was working towards the overthrow of the government and was preparing to wage a jihad against the British authorities.

Contents
In the first part of Noorul-Haq, Ghulam Ahmad has taken each objection individually and has written in their refutation. He then expounds the philosophy of Jihad in Islam and addresses the British government assuring them of his support and loyalty to any government which allows religious freedom, deals with justice and is sympathetic towards its subjects. There is a lengthy discussion in refutation of the Christian concept of the divinity and sonship of Jesus. With relation to Imadud-Din’s assertion that there have been no saints or holy personages within Islam, Ghulam Ahmad suggests that Islam is the only religion which is not based upon the stories of old but is capable of showing fresh signs of divine support in the present age.  Ghulam Ahmad asserts that the Islamic prophet Muhammad is the only man by following whom one can reach the status of perfect sainthood or nearness to God and that there have been numerous such personages within Islam. He presents himself as the prime and living example of this and indicates that he has been divinely chosen as the Mahdi by his complete obedience and love for Muhammad.

Challenge and controversy

Ghulam Ahmad explains that the reason why the book is written in Arabic is In order to expose the ignorance of the Arabic language on part of those Christian missionaries who claimed to be well-acquainted with the Arabic tongue, called themselves scholars of Islam and thus qualified to scrutinise the Quranic style. Their names are listed within the book. He challenges them to compete with his own writings in his claimed capacity as the representative of the Islamic prophet Muhammad; as an alternative to producing a book like unto the Quran to which (as is implied) his own book is a literary subordinate. Thus attempting to render their criticism of the Quran unqualified and unjustified. He offers them a respite of three months within which to produce a book like his and advertises a reward of 5,000 rupees if they succeed. During the course of writing the book, Ghulam Ahmad claimed to have received the revelation:

Towards the end of the first part of the book Ghulam Ahmad has enumerated a thousand curses for those who, having refused to compete with him, continue to deride at the Quran, and revile the prophet of Islam.

According to his critics, Ghulam Ahmad's  enumeration of a thousand curses in this book was excessively harsh. His followers however have maintained that this was in keeping with Qur'anic principles, was done so in order to provoke his adversaries into accepting his challenge and that such an approach was moderate when compared to the language used by Lahiz and other Christian critics of Islam at the time.

Part II
When in 1894 the lunar and solar eclipse took place during the Islamic month of Ramadhan, Ghulam Ahmad claimed that it was in support of his claim and in accordance with prophecy that these eclipses had occurred. Subsequently, many Ulema objected that the prophecy found in the tradition of Dar Qutni and attributed to the 7th century Imam Muhammad al-Baqir was not an authentic one and asserted that the occurrence was not in accordance with the conditions mentioned in the Hadith. In the second part of Noor-ul-Haq, Ghulam Ahmad has dealt with the authentication of the tradition and has argued that the occurrence was in precise accordance with the prophecy. He advertised a reward of 1,000 rupees to those who would refute the arguments presented therein.

See also
Writings of Mirza Ghulam Ahmad

References

External links
Noor-ul-Haq: Arabic
Truth About Eclipses

Islamic theology books
Works by Mirza Ghulam Ahmad
1894 books
19th-century Indian books
Indian religious texts